A circulation issue or circulation coin, sometimes called a business strike (US), is a coin minted and issued for commerce as opposed to those made as commemorative coins and proof coins. Circulation issue coins are normally produced in relatively large numbers, and are primarily meant to be used as pocket change, not collected.

Even though special collector coins, such as proof coinage, are produced in smaller numbers, the circulation issue coins are sometimes more valuable in high grade than their proof counterparts.  This is because whereas proof coins are almost always carefully preserved by their owners, circulation issue usually are not.

References 

Coins